Andoni Zubiaurre Dorronsoro (born 4 December 1996) is a Spanish footballer who plays for Real Sociedad as a goalkeeper.

Club career
Born in Ordizia, Gipuzkoa, Basque Country, Zubiaurre represented Ordizia KE and Antiguoko as a youth. In June 2015, he joined Real Sociedad and was assigned to the farm team in Tercera División.

Promoted to the reserves in Segunda División B for the 2017–18 season, Zubiaurre renewed his contract until 2021 on 13 June 2018. On 29 August of the following year, he further extended his link until 2022.

On 1 October 2020, Zubiaurre was loaned to Cultural y Deportiva Leonesa for the campaign. Upon returning, he was assigned back to the B-team, now in Segunda División, and made his professional debut on 14 August 2021 by starting in a 1–0 home win over CD Leganés.

References

External links
Profile at the Real Sociedad website

1996 births
Living people
People from Ordizia
Spanish footballers
Footballers from the Basque Country (autonomous community)
Association football goalkeepers
Segunda División players
Segunda División B players
Tercera División players
Antiguoko players
Real Sociedad C footballers
Real Sociedad B footballers
Cultural Leonesa footballers
Real Sociedad footballers
Sportspeople from Gipuzkoa